Will Birch (born 12 September 1948) is an English music journalist, songwriter, record producer and drummer.

Career
Birch was born in Southend-on-Sea, Essex, England.  He played drums in various bands in the Southend area before helping to form The Kursaal Flyers in 1973. Featuring singer Paul Shuttleworth, the Flyers developed a strong live reputation on London's pub rock scene in the mid-1970s, and released several albums. Their biggest commercial success came with the uncharacteristic Mike Batt produced hit single, "Little Does She Know", in 1976, which Birch co-wrote.

After The Kursaal Flyers disbanded in late 1977, Birch formed the power pop group, The Records. They released the minor hit "Starry Eyes" in 1978, again co-written by Birch; toured the United States; and recorded three albums. The Records split up in 1982.

Birch also co-wrote the song "A.1. on the Jukebox" with Dave Edmunds.

Meanwhile, Birch had already moved into production, working with the Liverpool-based band, Yachts, plus  Billy Bremner of Rockpile, Desmond Dekker, The Long Ryders, and later Dr. Feelgood.

In the 1990s he moved into music journalism, writing many articles on the British music scene and, in 2000, writing an acclaimed account of the 1970s pub rock scene, No Sleep Till Canvey Island.  He published a well-reviewed biography of Ian Dury, Ian Dury: The Definitive Biography in January 2010.

References

External links
 Will Birch website

1948 births
Living people
People from Southend-on-Sea
English rock drummers
English record producers
English songwriters
English male writers